The Baca-Korte House, at 615 S. Pacific in Las Vegas, New Mexico, was built in 1930.   It was listed on the National Register of Historic Places in 1985.

It has rubble stone foundations and walls;  its frame second floor loosely reflects Colonial Revival architecture.

References

Houses on the National Register of Historic Places in New Mexico
Colonial Revival architecture in New Mexico
Houses completed in 1930
Buildings and structures in San Miguel County, New Mexico
1930 establishments in New Mexico